Jethro Wood (March 16, 1774 – 1834) was the inventor of a cast-iron moldboard plow with replaceable parts, the first commercially successful iron moldboard plow.  His invention accelerated the development of American agriculture in the antebellum period.

Early life

Wood was born either in Dartmouth, Massachusetts or in Washington County, New York.  His parents were John Wood and Dinah Hussey. His family was Quaker, and Wood remained Quaker throughout his life, but was not particularly doctrinaire.

According to one account of Wood's childhood:
Once, while still very young, he had shaped a small plow out of metal, not dissimilar to the model which was later to form the basis for modern agriculture. But not satisfied with the mere making of it, and wishing to see it in operation, he fashioned a harness of corresponding size and fastened the family cat to his plow. The protests of the cat attracted the immediate attention of paternal authority, and the future inventor was soundly thrashed for his precocity. 

Wood spent his adult life in Cayuga County, New York, in the vicinity of Scipio. On January 1, 1793, Wood married Sylvia Howland of White Creek, New York; they had six children together.

Moldboard plow

Wood received a patent on an initial version of a cast-iron moldboard plow in 1814, and patented improvements on that plow in 1819.  The 1819 patent was the 19th patent issued for a plow in the United States.  The first patent on a cast-iron plow had been issued to Charles Newbold of New Jersey in 1793. During the development of the plow, he corresponded with Thomas Jefferson, who had been working on an improvement to the plow along slightly different lines.

A test of the 1819 model showed that it could plow a stony field without breaking.  It was highly successful in the eastern United States, but less effective against the clay soils and sod of the Midwest.

After the invention of the plow, much of Wood's time and money were consumed by pursuing patent infringement suits against small manufacturers around the country who had copied his design. One of those suits, Ex parte Wood, reached the Supreme Court.

Wood died in poverty in 1834.  He  had spent his entire "large fortune" on perfecting his invention and litigating the patent, and had earned less than $550 in total from his invention.

Wood's patent was renewed in 1833 by act of Congress, and his children continued to fight against infringements and campaign for changes to the patent law for some years.

Legacy

Wood's invention was later supplanted by the further improvements of John Deere, who furnished the plow with polished plowshares that enabled it to break up prairie sod.

The Jethro Wood House, Wood's residence in Poplar Ridge, New York, was built in 1805 and declared a National Historic Landmark in 1964. Current owners: Thomas Hoppel and his partner have extensively renovated and upgraded and it is currently a private residence.

References

Works cited

External links
Columbia Electronic Encyclopedia entry

People from Cayuga County, New York
1774 births
1834 deaths
American inventors
American Quakers
People from Dartmouth, Massachusetts